Elbe-Stremme-Fiener was a Verwaltungsgemeinschaft ("collective municipality") in the Jerichower Land district, in Saxony-Anhalt, Germany. It was situated north of Genthin, which was the seat of the Verwaltungsgemeinschaft, but not part of it. It was disbanded on 1 January 2010.

Subdivision
The Verwaltungsgemeinschaft Elbe-Stremme-Fiener consisted of the following municipalities:

 Brettin 
 Demsin 
 Jerichow
 Kade 
 Karow 
 Klitsche 
 Nielebock 
 Redekin 
 Roßdorf 
 Schlagenthin 
 Wulkow 
 Zabakuck

Former Verwaltungsgemeinschaften in Saxony-Anhalt